Priit Pallum (born in 1964 in Tallinn) is an Estonian diplomat.

In 1989 he graduated from Tartu State University. In 1991 he graduated from Estonian School of Diplomacy. Since 1991 he has worked for Estonian Foreign Ministry.

Diplomatic posts:
 2002–2006 Ambassador of Estonia to Netherlands
 2010–2014 Ambassador of Estonia to Hungary, Croatia and Slovenia
 2018–2021 Ambassador of Estonia to Greece, Albania and Cyprus
 since 2021 Ambassador of Estonia to OECD and UNESCO

In 2001 he was awarded with Order of the National Coat of Arms, V class.

References

Living people
1964 births
Estonian diplomats
Ambassadors of Estonia to Albania
Ambassadors of Estonia to Croatia
Ambassadors of Estonia to Cyprus
Ambassadors of Estonia to Greece
Ambassadors of Estonia to Hungary
Ambassadors of Estonia to the Netherlands
Ambassadors of Estonia to Slovenia
University of Tartu alumni
People from Tallinn